Goodenia hassallii  is a species of flowering plant in the family Goodeniaceae and is endemic to the south-west of Western Australia. It is an erect, shrubby perennial with linear to lance-shaped leaves with teeth on the edges, and racemes of blue flowers.

Description

Taxonomy and naming
Goodenia hassallii was first formally described in 1867 by Ferdinand von Mueller in Fragmenta Phytographiae Australiae from specimens collected by James Drummond.
The specific epithet (hassallii) honours Albert Young Hassell.

Distribution and habitat
This goodenia grows in gravelly, sandy soil in the Avon Wheatbelt, Geraldton Sandplains and Jarrah Forest biogeographic regions in the south-west of Western Australia.

Conservation status
Goodenia hassallii is classified as "not threatened" by the Government of Western Australia Department of Parks and Wildlife.

References

hassallii
Eudicots of Western Australia
Plants described in 1867
Taxa named by Ferdinand von Mueller
Endemic flora of Western Australia